Colourpoint Creative are an independent publisher based in Newtownards, Northern Ireland. They specialise in local history (Colourpoint Books) and educational textbooks (Colourpoint Educational).

Colourpoint are the primary supplier of educational textbooks for new CCEA A-level, GCSE and Key Stage 3 specifications in Northern Ireland and are the largest publisher of educational textbooks in Northern Ireland.

External links 
 – Colourpoint Creative
 – Colourpoint Books
 – Blackstaff Press
 – Colourpoint Educational
 – April Sky Design

Book publishing companies of Northern Ireland
Companies based in Newtownards